Knut Strøm (25 January 1923 – 10 September 2007) was a Norwegian resistance fighter and lieutenant colonel in the Norwegian army. He participated in the resistance work during World War II as an agent in the clandestine intelligence organisation XU. Knut Strøm was a platoon leader in the tysklandbrigaden (Germany brigade) in 1948
before he in 1949 started serving in Hans Majestet Kongens Garde (the Norwegian Royal Guards). In 1969 Knut Strøm was awarded an MBE-medal by the British ambassador Bernsley for his many years of service in exercise Hardfall.

References

Norwegian people of World War II
Norwegian resistance members
1923 births
2007 deaths